The Mexico women's national football team has represented Mexico at the FIFA Women's World Cup on three occasions, in 1999, 2011, and 2015.

FIFA Women's World Cup record

*Draws include knockout matches decided on penalty kicks.

Record by opponent

1999 FIFA Women's World Cup

Group D

2011 FIFA Women's World Cup

Group D

2015 FIFA Women's World Cup

Group D

Goalscorers

References

 
World Cup
Countries at the FIFA Women's World Cup